Graz Hauptbahnhof, abbreviated Graz Hbf (German for Graz Main Station; sometimes translated as Graz Central Station), is the main railway station in Graz, the capital of the Austrian state of Styria.

The station serves as a major node on the Southern Railway, which links it to Vienna in the north, and Slovenia in the south. It is also the terminus of the  Styrian Eastern Railway, which runs eastwards towards Hungary, and of the local Köflacherbahn to the west. In the future, the Koralm Railway will provide a direct link from Graz to Italy via Klagenfurt.

History

The first Railway station was opened here in 1847 but due to a big increase in passenger numbers a bigger station was constructed on the same site between 1871 and 1876.

In 1945 the grand station from 1876 was totally destroyed in allied bombing raids. 
In 1956 the building works on the current station were completed.
The station was built in the typical style of the 1950s and the main ticket hall is now a listed building.

In 2001 the station was modernised and partly rebuilt to incorporate escalators to the platforms and also a small shopping mall.

Project Hauptbahnhof 2020

 
Since 2010 there has been further major building work taking place to prepare the station for its new role as an international transport hub and to cope with increasing national and regional traffic. When the construction of the Koralm Railway is completed all international traffic from Vienna to Italy will pass through Graz.

These works include the rebuilding and lengthening of all platforms plus the construction of two extra platforms for regional trains.
All platforms will also have new modern roofing.

One of the two foot tunnels to the platforms has been lengthened to the Wagner Biro Straße giving access to the station from the west as well.

The railway bridge over the Eggenberger Straße has also been rebuilt to make space for extra tracks.

A new local transport hub for trams and buses has been built on and under the station forecourt to connect all four tram lines to the station which run through the local area.
Up until recently two of these tramlines used to terminate on the station forecourt while the other two passed the station nearby.     
To rectify this problem a new subsurface tram stop has been constructed under the station forecourt enabling all four tram lines to have a stop just outside the main entrance to the station.

Train services
The station is served by the following services:

RailJet services Graz - Vienna - Breclav - Brno - Pardubice - Prague
EuroCity services Zagreb - Maribor - Graz - Vienna

References

External links 
 
 Information on Graz Hbf from OBB web site

Railway stations in Styria
Transport in Graz
Buildings and structures in Graz